UFC 21: Return of the Champions was a mixed martial arts event held by the Ultimate Fighting Championship on July 16, 1999 at the Five Seasons Events Center in Cedar Rapids, Iowa. The event was seen live on pay per view in the United States, and later released on home video.

History
UFC 21 marked significant rule changes due to the Council of the Mixed Martial Arts Commission: preliminary bouts now consisted of two five minute-rounds, main card bouts were three five-minute rounds and championship bouts were five five-minute rounds (similar to the Unified Rules of Mixed Martial Arts used today in the United States). UFC 21 was the first UFC event to adopt the 10-point must system, commonly used in boxing, to judge fights instead of each judge merely stating their choice of fighter. 10 points are awarded for fighters who win the round, 6-9 points for the fighter that loses the round. Points are awarded for Octagon control, effective striking, grappling/near submissions, and aggressiveness.

During the event, it was announced that UFC Middleweight Champion Frank Shamrock would defend his title at UFC 22 against rising star Tito Ortiz.

Results

See also 
 Ultimate Fighting Championship
 List of UFC champions
 List of UFC events
 1999 in UFC

External links
Official UFC 21 Page
UFC21 fights reviews

References

Ultimate Fighting Championship events
1999 in mixed martial arts
Mixed martial arts in Iowa
Sports in Cedar Rapids, Iowa
1999 in sports in Iowa